The 48th Bombardment Squadron is an inactive United States Air Force unit. Its last assignment was with the 41st Bombardment Group, based at Manila, Philippines. It was inactivated on 27 January 1946.

History
Activated at March Field, California in early 1941 as part of the prewar mobilization of the Army Air Corps.  Equipped with B-18 Bolos and Lockheed Hudsons.  Engaged in coastal patrols over Southern California, later over the San Francisco area.

Re-equipped with B-25 Medium bombers, deployed to Seventh Air Force in Hawaii during the late summer of 1942.  Completed final training in Hawaii and moved to Tarawa in the Central Pacific in December 1943. Entered combat and attacked enemy installations, airfields, and shipping in the Marshall Islands in preparation for the invasion by US forces, and after February 1944 staged through captured fields on Eniwetok to attack shipping in the Caroline Islands.

In April 1944 moved to Makin where its missions were directed primarily against shipping and bypassed islands in the Marshalls and Carolines. Returned to Hawaii in October 1944 for training with rockets and new B-25's. Moved to Okinawa, May–June 1945. Bombed airfields, railways, and harbor facilities on Kyushu until August 1945. Also flew some missions against airfields in China.

Moved to Manila in December 1945. Inactivated in the Philippines on January 27, 1946.

Lineage
 Constituted 48th Bombardment Squadron (Medium) on 20 November 1940
 Activated on 15 January 1941.
 Inactivated on 27 January 1946.

Assignments
 41st Bombardment Group, 15 January 1941 – 27 January 1946

Stations

 March Field, California, January 15, 1941
 Davis-Monthan Army Airfield, Arizona, 16 May 1941
 Muroc Army Airfield, California, December 10, 1941
 Visalia Army Airfield, California, 5 February 1942
 Bakersfield-Kern County MAP, California, 9 January 1942
 NAS Alameda, California, 2 July 1942
 Hammer Field, California, 1 December 1942 – 29 September 1943
 Hickam Field, Territory of Hawaii, October 20, 1943

 Abemama Airfield, Abemama, Gilbert Islands, 22 December 1943
 Makin Airfield, Makin, Gilbert Islands, April 21, 1944
 Operated from: East Field, Saipan, Mariana Islands, 23 July-21 August 1944
 Wheeler Field, Territory of Hawaii, 14  October 1944
 Yontan Airfield, Okinawa, June 7, 1945
 Fort William McKinley, Philippines, December 13, 1945 – January 27, 1946.

Aircraft
 B-18 Bolo, 1941
 Lockheed Hudson, 1941–1942
 B-25 Mitchell, 1942-1945.

References

External links

Military units and formations established in 1940
048